Tamask or Tamesk may refer to:
 Tamesk, Amol
 Tamask, Dabudasht, Amol County